Covington Community High School is a high school located in Covington, Indiana. The school was given a "B" grade for accountability by the Indiana Department of Education in 2016.

Athletics 
The Trojans are members of the Wabash River Conference.

 Baseball (boys)
 12 sectional championships                        1977–78, 1979–80, 1980–81, 1982–83, 1983–84, 1984–85, 1986–87, 1993–94, 2002-03 (2A), 2004-05 (A), 2006-07 (A), 2017-18 (A)
 Basketball (boys & girls)
 boys 25 sectional championship                1922–23, 1944–45, 1946–47, 1950–51, 1955–56, 1959–60, 1969–70, 1970–71, 1973–74, 1976–77, 1983–84, 1984–85, 1987–88, 1987–88, 1997-98 (A), 2000-01 (2A), 2001-02 (2A), 2002-03 (2A), 2003-04 (A), 2004-05 (A), 2006-07 (A), 2009-10 (A), 2015-16 (2A), 2016-17 (2A), 2017-18 (2A)
boys 4 regional championship                    1944–45, 1950–51, 1959–60, 2000-01 (2A)
 girls 5 sectional championships                 1978–79, 1981–82, 1986–87, 1996–97, 1998-99 (A)
 Cross country (co-ed)
 Cheerleading (co-ed)

 Football (boys)
 Wabash River Conference Champions 1964 (Undefeated)

Volleyball (girls)
 9 sectional championships                          1983, 1985, 1986, 1992, 1995, 2015 (2A), 2016 (2A), 2017 (A), 2018 (A)
 1 regional championship                               2018 (A)
 Golf (boys & girls)
Softball (girls)
 3 sectional championships                          2012-13 (A), 2013-14 (A), 2014-15 (A)
Tennis (boys & girls)
 boys 8 sectional championships                 1991, 1992, 1993, 2000, 2001, 2002, 2004, 2016
 girls 7 sectional championships                 1992–93, 1993–94, 1994–95, 1995–96, 1996–97, 1997–98, 1999-00
 Track & field (co-ed)
 Soccer (co-ed)
 4 sectional championships                                                         2012 (A), 2013 (A), 2014 (A), 2016 (A)
Wrestling (boys)
 2 sectional championships                          1985–86, 1999-00

See also
 List of high schools in Indiana

References

External links
 Official website

Public high schools in Indiana
Buildings and structures in Fountain County, Indiana